Polygrammodes quatrilis is a moth in the family Crambidae. It was described by Herbert Druce in 1902. It is found in Venezuela and Colombia.

The forewings are white, although the costal margin and all the veins are black. The hindwings are semihyaline white. The fringes of both wings are white.

References

Spilomelinae
Moths described in 1902
Moths of South America